"Could You Be the One?" is a song by Hüsker Dü from their Warehouse: Songs and Stories. The song was released as a single and an EP, both in the United Kingdom.

Allmusic wrote that the song is "Hüsker Dü at its melodic best ... the last real gasp from a band that was about to hit the wall."

A video was filmed for the song, and it was the band's only video that had them performing on a sound stage as opposed to featuring live clips of them playing.

"Could You Be the One?" was performed with "She's A Woman (And Now He Is a Man)" during the band's appearance on The Late Show with Joan Rivers. The song was performed on the Today Show while the show was taping from Minneapolis, Minnesota.

The song was written by Bob Mould. A live version of the B-side "Everytime" (written by Greg Norton) appears on the live album The Living End.

Single track listing
Side One
"Could You Be the One?" (Mould)
Side Two
"Everytime" (Norton)

EP track listing
Side One
"Could You Be the One?" (Mould)
Side Two
"Everytime" (Norton)
"Charity, Chastity, Prudence, and Hope" (Hart)

Notes and references

External links
[ Review] by Allmusic
Lyrics of this song - Could You Be the One

Hüsker Dü songs
1987 songs
Song recordings produced by Bob Mould
Songs written by Bob Mould
1987 singles
Warner Records singles